Çağla Demirsal (born January 23, 1995) is a Turkish ice dancer. With partner Berk Akalın, she is the 2011 Turkish national champion and placed 14th at the 2013 World Junior Championships.

Programs 
(with Akalın)

Competitive highlights 
(with Akalın)

References

External links 

 

Turkish female ice dancers
1995 births
Living people
Sportspeople from İzmit
20th-century Turkish sportswomen
21st-century Turkish sportswomen